Phacelia humilis, with the common name low phacelia, is a species of phacelia. It is native to the Western United States, from central Washington to central California, where it grows in mountain and foothill habitat.

Varieties
Phacelia humilis var. humilis - most instances of this plant are this variety
Phacelia humilis var. dudleyi - is known only from the southern Sierra Nevada and adjacent Tehachapi Mountains of California.

Description
It is an annual herb with an erect stem growing up to 20 centimeters tall. It is glandular and coated in stiff hairs. The oval leaves are 1 to 4 centimeters long. The inflorescence is a one-sided curving or coiling cyme of bell-shaped purple flowers. Each flower is roughly half a centimeter long and surrounded by a calyx of sepals which are coated densely in long, straight, white hairs.

External links
Jepson Manual Treatment
Washington Burke Museum
Photo gallery

humilis
Flora of the Sierra Nevada (United States)
Flora of the West Coast of the United States
Flora of California
Flora of Oregon
Flora of Washington (state)
Flora of Nevada
Flora without expected TNC conservation status